Shudo or Shūdō is a Japanese surname that may refer to the following notable people:
Shūdō Higashinakano (born 1947), Japanese historian
Shudo Kawawa (born 1965), Japanese swimmer
Shinichi Shudo (born 1965), Japanese handball player
Takeshi Shudo (1949–2010), Japanese scriptwriter and novelist

Japanese-language surnames